Richard Francis O'Neill (August 29, 1928 – November 17, 1998) was an American stage, film and television character actor best known for playing Irish cops, fathers, judges and army generals. He began his acting career as an original company member of Arena Stage in Washington, D.C.

Biography

Early life and television roles
O'Neill studied at Syracuse University.  He served in the Navy then returned to the theater. In the late 1950s, he began appearing on television. His television credits include Car 54, Where Are You?, The Honeymooners, Barney Miller, Sanford and Son, Good Times, Kaz, M*A*S*H, The Feather and Father Gang, The Facts of Life, Family Matters, Mad About You, Murder, She Wrote, Father Dowling Mysteries, Three's Company, Wonder Woman, One Day at a Time, Magnum, P.I., A Man Called Intrepid, Growing Pains, Dark Justice, Cheers, Dharma & Greg, Cybill, The Fresh Prince of Bel-Air to Home Improvement. He was probably best known for his role as Charlie Cagney in the television series Cagney & Lacey. Before moving to California, he appeared on the Broadway stage in such plays as Promises, Promises, The Unsinkable Molly Brown, and Skyscraper.

Film roles
His film credits include The Mugger (1958), To the Shores of Hell (1966), Gammera the Invincible (1966), Pretty Poison (1968), Some of My Best Friends Are... (1971), The Taking of Pelham One Two Three (1974), The Front Page (1974), Posse (1975), St. Ives (1976), American Raspberry (1977), MacArthur (1977), The Buddy Holly Story (1978), House Calls (1978), The Jerk (1979), Wolfen (1981), Chiller (1985), Prizzi's Honor (1985), The Mosquito Coast (1986), She's Out of Control (1989) and Loose Cannons (1990).

Personal life
He met his wife Jackie Shaw O'Neill when they appeared together in a production of The Sound of Music. On November 17, 1998, O'Neill died of heart failure at the age of 70 at St. John's Medical Center in Santa Monica.

Filmography

Film

Television

References

External links

 
 
 

1928 births
1998 deaths
Male actors from New York City
Syracuse University alumni
American male film actors
American male stage actors
American male television actors
20th-century American male actors
20th-century American singers